Trevor "Hot Sauce" Smith (born January 5, 1981) is an American professional mixed martial artist who competes in the Middleweight division.  A professional competitor since 2009, Smith formerly competed for Strikeforce and Ultimate Fighting Championship.

Background
Smith was born in Vancouver, Washington and lived there for part of his upbringing. Smith was a state champion in wrestling at Mark Morris High School in Longview, Washington and a NJCAA All-American out of Highline Community College in 2002. He then continued his career at the noted Division I wrestling program at Iowa State University, where he earned a bachelor's degree in marketing.

Mixed martial arts career

Early career
Smith started his career in 2009. He fought mainly for organizations within his home state. With a MMA record of 7–1, losing only once to Devin Cole, he signed with Strikeforce.

Strikeforce
Smith made his debut on June 24, 2011, at Strikeforce Challengers: Fodor vs. Terry against Keith Berry. He won via technical submission in the second round.

Smith faced T. J. Cook on November 18, 2011, at Strikeforce Challengers: Britt vs. Sayers. He won via submission in the first round.

Smith faced Gian Villante on January 7, 2012, at Strikeforce: Rockhold vs. Jardine. He lost via TKO in the first round.

Smith was expected to face Tim Kennedy on November 3, 2012, at Strikeforce: Cormier vs. Mir. However, the event was cancelled due to injuries to headliner Frank Mir, as well to co-headliner and middleweight champion Luke Rockhold.  This bout eventually took place on January 12, 2013, at Strikeforce: Marquardt vs. Saffiedine.  Smith lost via submission in the third round.

Ultimate Fighting Championship
In his UFC debut, Smith faced Ed Herman on July 27, 2013, at UFC on Fox 8. He lost the fight via split decision. Despite the loss on the scorecards, Smith earned his first Fight of the Night bonus award for his performance.

Smith fought Brian Houston on January 15, 2014, at UFC Fight Night 35. He won the fight by split decision.

Smith faced Thales Leites on April 11, 2014, at UFC Fight Night 39.  He lost the fight via TKO in the first round.

Smith faced Tor Troéng on July 16, 2014, at UFC Fight Night 46. He won the fight by unanimous decision.

Smith faced Caio Magalhães on November 8, 2014, at UFC Fight Night 56. Smith lost the fight quickly by knockout in the first round.  The stoppage was not without a bit of controversy.  Magalhães stunned Smith with a knee and forced a referee stoppage after landing a barrage of follow up punches.  It appeared that during the final flurry, several hammerfists landed on the back of Smith's head as he lay unconscious on the canvas. Following the match, Magalhães stated "I didn't notice that," in reference to the strike to the back of Smith's head. "His coach talked to me after the fight, said I punched the back of his head, but I didn't notice it. The referee should have stepped in if he saw something, but he was already out from the punch and knee I landed."

Smith faced Dan Miller on July 12, 2015, at The Ultimate Fighter 21 Finale. He won the fight via lop-sided unanimous decision.

Smith was expected to face promotional newcomer Leonardo Augusto Guimarães on February 21, 2016, at UFC Fight Night 83. However, Smith pulled out of the fight in early February citing a hand injury and was replaced by Anthony Smith.

Smith next faced promotional newcomer Joe Gigilotti on August 6, 2016, at UFC Fight Night 92. He won the one-sided fight via unanimous decision.

Smith faced Andrew Sanchez on December 9, 2016, at UFC Fight Night 102. He lost the fight by unanimous decision.

Smith faced Chris Camozzi on May 28, 2017, at UFC Fight Night 109. He won the fight by unanimous decision.

Smith was scheduled to face promotional newcomer Ramazan Emeev on October 21, 2017, at UFC Fight Night 118. However, Smith pulled out of the fight in early October citing injury and was replaced by Sam Alvey.

Smith faced Elias Theodorou on May 27, 2018, at UFC Fight Night 130. He lost the fight via unanimous decision.

Smith faced Zak Cummings on December 15, 2018, at UFC on Fox 31. He lost the fight by unanimous decision.

Smith was expected to face Antônio Rogério Nogueira in a light heavyweight bout on November 16, 2019, at UFC on ESPN+ 22. However, Nogueira was forced to pull out of the event due to injury, resulting in the cancellation of the bout.

Smith was scheduled to face Alonzo Menifield on December 7, 2019, at UFC on ESPN 7. However, on November 10, 2019, it was reported that Menifield pulled out from the event for undisclosed reason, and he was replaced by Makhmud Muradov.  He lost the fight via knock out in round three.

In March 2020, Smith got listed as a former fighter on the UFC website.

Championships and accomplishments

Amateur wrestling
National Collegiate Athletic Association
Big 12 Conference 197 lb: 4th place out of Iowa State University (2004)
National Junior College Athletic Association
NJCAA  All-American out of Highline Community College (2002)
NJCAA  197 lb: 3rd place out of Highline Community College (2002)
Washington Interscholastic Athletics Association
189 lb Washington state champion (out of Mark Morris High School) (2000)

Mixed martial arts
Ultimate Fighting Championship
Fight of the Night (One time)

Mixed martial arts record

|-
|Loss
|align=center|15–10
|Makhmud Muradov
|KO (punch)
|UFC on ESPN: Overeem vs. Rozenstruik 
|
|align=center|3
|align=center|4:09
|Washington, D.C., United States
|
|-
|Loss
|align=center|15–9
|Zak Cummings
|Decision (unanimous)
|UFC on Fox: Lee vs. Iaquinta 2
|
|align=center|3
|align=center|5:00
|Milwaukee, Wisconsin, United States
|
|-
|Loss
|align=center|15–8
|Elias Theodorou
|Decision (unanimous)
|UFC Fight Night: Thompson vs. Till
|
|align=center|3
|align=center|5:00
|Liverpool, England
|
|-
|Win
|align=center|15–7
|Chris Camozzi
|Decision (unanimous)
|UFC Fight Night: Gustafsson vs. Teixeira
|
|align=center|3
|align=center|5:00
|Stockholm, Sweden
|
|-
|Loss
|align=center|14–7
|Andrew Sanchez
|Decision (unanimous)
|UFC Fight Night: Lewis vs. Abdurakhimov
|
|align=center|3
|align=center|5:00
|Albany, New York, United States
| 
|-
|Win
|align=center|14–6
|Joe Gigliotti
|Decision (unanimous)
|UFC Fight Night: Rodríguez vs. Caceres 
|
|align=center|3
|align=center|5:00
|Salt Lake City, Utah, United States
|
|-
| Win
| align=center| 13–6
| Dan Miller
| Decision (unanimous)
| The Ultimate Fighter: American Top Team vs. Blackzilians Finale 
| 
| align=center| 3
| align=center| 5:00
| Las Vegas, Nevada, United States
| 
|-
| Loss
| align=center| 12–6
| Caio Magalhães
| KO (knee and punches)
| UFC Fight Night: Shogun vs. Saint Preux
| 
| align=center| 1
| align=center| 0:31
| Uberlândia, Brazil
| 
|-
| Win
| align=center| 12–5
| Tor Troéng
| Decision (unanimous)
| UFC Fight Night: McGregor vs. Brandao
| 
| align=center| 3
| align=center| 5:00
| Dublin, Ireland
| 
|-
| Loss
| align=center| 11–5
| Thales Leites
| TKO (punches)
| UFC Fight Night: Nogueira vs. Nelson
| 
| align=center| 1
| align=center| 0:45
| Abu Dhabi, United Arab Emirates
| 
|-
| Win
| align=center| 11–4
| Brian Houston
| Decision (split)
| UFC Fight Night: Rockhold vs. Philippou
| 
| align=center| 3
| align=center| 5:00
| Duluth, Georgia, United States
| 
|-
| Loss
| align=center| 10–4
| Ed Herman
| Decision (split)
| UFC on Fox: Johnson vs. Moraga
| 
| align=center| 3
| align=center| 5:00
| Seattle, Washington, United States
| 
|-
| Loss
| align=center| 10–3
| Tim Kennedy
| Submission (guillotine choke)
| Strikeforce: Marquardt vs. Saffiedine
| 
| align=center| 3
| align=center| 1:36
| Oklahoma City, Oklahoma, United States
| 
|-
| Win
| align=center| 10–2
| Alexandre Moreno
| Submission (guillotine choke)
| BXC: The Rise
| 
| align=center| 1
| align=center| 4:21
| Springfield, Massachusetts, United States
| 
|-
| Loss
| align=center| 9–2
| Gian Villante
| TKO (punches)
| Strikeforce: Rockhold vs. Jardine
| 
| align=center| 1
| align=center| 1:05
| Las Vegas, Nevada, United States
| 
|-
| Win
| align=center| 9–1
| T. J. Cook
| Submission (guillotine choke)
| Strikeforce Challengers: Britt vs. Sayers
| 
| align=center| 1
| align=center| 4:28
| Las Vegas, Nevada, United States
| 
|-
| Win
| align=center| 8–1
| Keith Berry
| Technical Submission (north-south choke)
| Strikeforce Challengers: Fodor vs. Terry
| 
| align=center| 2
| align=center| 3:02
| Kent, Washington, United States
|
|-
| Win
| align=center| 7–1
| Jared Torgeson
| Submission (guillotine choke)
| CS: CageSport 14
| 
| align=center| 1
| align=center| 1:18
| Tacoma, Washington, United States
| 
|-
| Win
| align=center| 6–1
| Wes Swofford
| Submission (keylock)
| SF 29: All In
| 
| align=center| 1
| align=center| 4:15
| Grand Ronde, Oregon, United States
| 
|-
| Win
| align=center| 5–1
| Pete Werve
| Submission (rear-naked choke)
| ROTR 13: Redemption
| 
| align=center| 1
| align=center| 3:33
| Snoqualmie, Washington, United States
| 
|-
| Loss
| align=center| 4–1
| Devin Cole
| TKO (punches)
| ROTR: Rumble on the Ridge 12
| 
| align=center| 1
| align=center| 0:31
| Snoqualmie, Washington, United States
| 
|-
| Win
| align=center| 4–0
| Matt Kovacs
| Submission (guillotine choke)
| LMMA: Lightning at Legends
| 
| align=center| 1
| align=center| 2:22
| Toppenish, Washington, United States
| 
|-
| Win
| align=center| 3–0
| Jesus Rodriguez
| Submission (keylock)
| LMMA: Lightning at Legends
| 
| align=center| 1
| align=center| N/A
| Toppenish, Washington, United States
| 
|-
| Win
| align=center| 2–0
| Tim Perales
| Submission (guillotine choke)
| Alliance Fights: Counterstrike
| 
| align=center| 1
| align=center| 4:03
| Kent, Washington, United States
| 
|-
| Win
| align=center| 1–0
| Brian Martin
| KO (punches)
| DC: Battle for the Bobcats
| 
| align=center| 1
| align=center| 0:37
| Aberdeen, Washington, United States
|

See also
 List of current UFC fighters
 List of male mixed martial artists

References

External links
 
 

1981 births
Living people
American male mixed martial artists
Light heavyweight mixed martial artists
Middleweight mixed martial artists
Mixed martial artists utilizing collegiate wrestling
Mixed martial artists from Washington (state)
Sportspeople from Vancouver, Washington
People from Longview, Washington
Ultimate Fighting Championship male fighters
American male sport wrestlers
Amateur wrestlers
Highline College alumni